Hilgay railway station was a station in Hilgay, Norfolk, United Kingdom which is now closed. It was on the Fen Line between King's Lynn and Cambridge. It was closed in 1963 along with nearby Stow Bardolph.

Hiams Siding and Hiams Tramway 
One mile south of Hilgay station, Hiams Siding provided an interchange with the narrow gauge Hiams Tramway, an agricultural tramway which extended 3 km west on a zigzag alignment to the west across the fields of the Hiams Estate to Willow Glen Farm.

Accident 

On 1 June 1939, a passenger train was in collision with a lorry on an occupation crossing just north of the station and was derailed.

Route

References

External links
 Hilgay station on navigable 1946 O.S. map

Former Great Eastern Railway stations
Disused railway stations in Norfolk
Railway stations in Great Britain opened in 1847
Railway stations in Great Britain closed in 1963
1847 establishments in England